The Immerather Maar is a maar in the municipality of Immerath in the county of  Vulkaneifel in the German state of Rhineland-Palatinate. It is part of a designated  nature reserve and Special Area of Conservation.

Formation 
The maar was formed by volcanic activity about 40,000 to 70,000 years ago. Around 1750 the maar was drained by a maar stream and dried out so that most of it could be used as pastureland. The area of the maar was even divided into plots. Between 1914 and 1918 the stream became wild. This led to it being blocked and the formation of a shallow maar. The height of the water surface has changed little since then.

Description 
The Immerather Maar is the smallest and shallowest of the Eifel maar lakes. It is located at a height of 368.1 metres above sea level (NN). The lakebed is flat and level, and there are only obstacles, in the form of fallen trees and tree stumps, in the water near the shores. The ground drops evenly from the shore towards the middle of the maar, except in the area of the outlet where there is a step; the water depth rising from 0.6 metres to 2.8 metres over a distance of 5 metres. The turbidity of the water has reduced in recent years, due to increasing plant growth, and now varies between 0.25 and 2.0 metres depending on the season. The water has a renewal time of 0.3 years. The maar does not have an above-ground inflow, but is fed exclusively by  surface and ground water in the crater.

The Immerather Maar is mainly a recreational area. Because of its large fish population, the waters are used by anglers.

Two large fish die-offs in the last few years have almost wiped out the stock of bream. The remaining fish species are rudd, perch, pike, tench, carp and eel.

Nature reserve 
The Immerather Maar and its shore area were designated as a nature reserve by the Regierungsbezirk of Trier on 12 June 1979. The purpose of the protection is to preserve the typical character of the maar in its entirety, including the natural vegetation along the banks of the river and to preserve its fauna and flora. The protected area covers an area of 61.29 hectares.

References

Literature 
 Werner D´hein: Natur- und Kulturführer Vulkanlandeifel. Mit 26 Stationen der „Deutschen Vulkanstraße“. Gaasterland-Verlag, Düsseldorf 2006, 

IUCN Category IV
Special Areas of Conservation in Germany
Maars of the Eifel
Nature reserves in Rhineland-Palatinate
Lakes of Rhineland-Palatinate
Vulkaneifel